Happy Together is a 1989 Hong Kong film.

Cast and roles
 Cherie Chung	
 Vivian Chow	
 Lowell Lo	
 Chingmy Yau		
 Lawrence Cheng		
 Kenny Bee

External links
 IMDb entry
 HK cinemagic entry

Hong Kong romantic comedy films
1989 films
1980s Hong Kong films